Jahadabad (also Romanized as Jahādābād) is a village in Salehabad Rural District, Salehabad District, Bahar County, Hamadan Province, Iran. At the 2006 census, its population was 89, in 17 families.

References 

Populated places in Bahar County